Elżbieta Sikora (born 20 October 1943 in Lviv, other sources write 1944 or 1945) is a Polish composer who has been resident in France since 1981. She has composed stage, orchestral, chamber, choral, vocal, and electroacoustic works as well as film scores.

Sikora studied under Pierre Schaeffer, François Bayle, Tadeusz Baird, Zbigniew Rudzinski.

She received numerous honors including First Prize in the GEDOK competition in Mannheim (1981, for Guernica, hommage à Pablo Picasso), the Prix de la Partition Pédagogique and the Prix Stéphane Chapelier-Clergue-Gabriel-Marie, both from SACEM (both 1994) and the SACD Prix Nouveau Talent Musique (1996).

Her operas are Ariadna (1977), Derrière son Double (1983), L'arrache-coeur (1992) and Madame Curie (2011). Her ballets are Blow-up (1980), Waste Land (1983), La Clef De Verre (1986).

References

External links

 Elżbieta Sikora at PWMEdition
Taming the Machine: An Interview with Elżbieta Sikora

Polish classical composers
1943 births
Living people
Musicians from Lviv
Women in electronic music
Polish opera composers
Women opera composers
Women classical composers
Polish emigrants to France
20th-century Polish musicians
20th-century classical composers
21st-century Polish musicians
21st-century classical composers
20th-century women composers
21st-century women composers
Polish women composers